Pinjar is a 2003 Indian period drama film directed by Chandraprakash Dwivedi. The film is about the Hindu-Muslim problems during the partition of India and is based on a Punjabi novel of the same name, written by Amrita Pritam. Urmila Matondkar, Manoj Bajpayee and Sanjay Suri portray the lead roles. Besides critical acclaim, the film also won the National Film Award for Best Feature Film on National Integration and Special Jury Award for Bajpayee.

Plot 
"Pinjar" is set in the time of the 1947 partition.

Puro is a young woman of Hindu background, who lives a happy, comfortable life with her family. She is engaged to a kind young man, Ramchand, who is from an upstanding family. While on an outing with her younger sister Rajjo, Puro is suddenly kidnapped by a mysterious man, Rashid. Rashid's family has an ancestral dispute with Puro's family. In the past, Puro's family had made Rashid's family homeless by taking over their property. Puro's uncle had even kidnapped Rashid's aunt and then released her after raping her. The task of exacting revenge is given to Rashid, and his family tells him to kidnap Puro, to settle the score.

Rashid goes through with the kidnapping but cannot bring himself to be cruel to Puro, since he is drawn to her. One night, Puro manages to escape and return to her parents. Her parents woefully turn away their daughter, explaining that if Puro were to stay, Rashid's extended clan would slaughter everyone in their family. Left with no support, Puro returns to Rashid who is well-aware of Puro's escape; he knew she wouldn't be let in by her parents and had been waiting for her nearby.

After a few months, Puro's family marries their son Trilok to Ramchand's younger sister, Lajjo, while Rajjo is married to Ramchand's cousin. Meanwhile, Rashid marries Puro, and they settle into an uneasy routine of husband and wife, during which time Puro becomes pregnant but miscarries.

The British colonialists leave India and the Subcontinent reels under the effects of the partition. Ramchand's uncle, cousin and Rajjo leave for India and are safe. Ramchand, his parents and Lajjo are caught in the riots. Ramchand hurriedly leaves for India with his younger sister and mother; his father is already missing. Shortly after, Lajjo is kidnapped by rioters. Puro meets Ramchand, who woefully tells her of Lajjo's situation. Puro finds Lajjo and helps her escape with Rashid's assistance. This incident brings Puro and Rashid closer, and Puro sees Rashid's loyalty towards her and his care for her family. They bring Lajjo to Lahore where Trilok and Ramchand come to receive her.

Trilok has a tearful reunion with Puro and explains to her that if she so chooses, she can start a new life, as Ramchand is ready to accept her even now. Puro surprises Trilok by refusing and saying that after everything that has happened, she is where she belongs. Ramchand responds with tremendous empathy to Puro, as he sees that she has accepted Rashid. Meanwhile, Rashid slowly tries to merge into the crowd, making it easier for Puro to leave with her family. He is heartbroken, as he is deeply in love with her, but wants her to be happy. However, Puro seeks Rashid out and the two tearfully bid Ramchand, Trilok, and Lajjo farewell forever.

Cast
 Urmila Matondkar as Puro/ Hamida
 Manoj Bajpayee as Rashid
 Sanjay Suri as Ramchand
 Sandali Sinha as Laajo
 Priyanshu Chatterjee as Trilok
 Isha Koppikar as Rajjo
 Lilette Dubey as Tara- Puro's mother
 Kulbhushan Kharbanda as Mohanlal- Puro's father
 Alok Nath as Shyamlal- Ramchand's father
 Farida Jalal as Ramchand's mother
 Seema Biswas as Pagli- Mad Woman
 Dina Pathak as Rashid's aunt
 Sudha Shivpuri as Rashid's mother
 Pradeep Kuckreja as Hukamchand
 Salima Raza as Hukamchand's wife
 Ghulam Arif as Managing director
 Rohitash Gaud as Rashid's brother
 Saurabh Bavaliya as Laajo's cousin child
 Niharika as Kamla
 Savita Bajaj as Daai- Midwife
 Parveena Bano as Rahim's wife

Soundtrack 

All of the tracks were composed by Uttam Singh, with lyrics by Gulzar. Tracks "Charkha Chalati Maa" and "Waris Shah Nu" lyrics by Amrita Pritam.

Critical reception

Amberish K Diwanji of Rediff praised the acting performances of Urmila Matondkar, Priyanshu Chatterjee, Manoj Bajpai and the art direction of Muneesh Sappel but criticized the climax of the film. The critic gave the film a rating of 4 out of 5 saying that, "Pinjar is a must-see. Don't miss it." Derek Elley of Variety reviewed the film saying that, "A handsomely shot drama centered on a Hindu woman's travails during the 1947 Partition, "Pinjar" ranks as one of the better Bollywood treatments of this still hot-button issue. Good performances, especially by lead actress Urmila Matondkar and by Manoj Bajpai as her Muslim partner, compensate for a slightly wobbly structure". Kshama Rao of Glamsham said that, "The music (Uttam Singh), the painstaking research (Muneesh Sappel) that has gone into the costumes and set designs is remarkable. Last but not the least, Dr Dwivedi almost had a winner on hand if he had not taken too long to build up the drama." Anupama Chopra of India Today said that, "While Matondkar struggles to rise above her natural artifice Manoj Bajpai is superb as the angst-ridden Muslim abductor. But the sweat and hard work is stunted by the screenplay. Finally, what could have been a great film remains only a commendable effort." Taran Adarsh of Bollywood Hungama praised the performances of Urmila Matondkar and Manoj Bajpai but criticized the long length of the movie and its slow pace specially towards the climax. The critic gave the film a rating of 3 out of 5 saying that, "On the whole, PINJAR caters more to the thinking audience. Also, it’s for those who like period fares." Kunal Shah of Sify gave the film a rating of 2 out of 5 saying that, "Overall, the film is brilliantly executed and handled with utmost sensitivity but its length is one factor, which might affect its prospects in the long run." Chitra Mahesh of The Hindu praised the acting performances but criticized the pacing of the film which she found slow and in conclusion said that, "one cannot help admiring the way he(The Director) has put together a team that has brought out such a visually, beautiful film."

Awards 
 2004: Filmfare Best Art Direction Award - Munish Sappal
 2004: National Film Award - Special Jury Award - Manoj Bajpai

See also
 List of Asian historical drama films

References

External links
 

2003 films
2000s Hindi-language films
Indian drama films
Films scored by Uttam Singh
Films based on Indian novels
Films set in Punjab, India
Films set in Lahore
Films set in the partition of India
Hindi-language drama films
Films set in 1947
Best Film on National Integration National Film Award winners
2003 drama films
20th Century Fox films
Films directed by Chandraprakash Dwivedi